Backward compatibility (sometimes known as backwards compatibility) is a property of an operating system, product, or technology that allows for interoperability with an older legacy system, or with input designed for such a system, especially in telecommunications and computing.

Modifying a system in a way that does not allow backward compatibility is sometimes called "breaking" backward compatibility.

A complementary concept is forward compatibility. A design that is forward-compatible usually has a roadmap for compatibility with future standards and products.

Usage

In hardware
A simple example of both backward and forward compatibility is the introduction of FM radio in stereo. FM radio was initially mono, with only one audio channel represented by one signal. With the introduction of two-channel stereo FM radio, many listeners had only mono FM receivers. Forward compatibility for mono receivers with stereo signals was achieved by sending the sum of both left and right audio channels in one signal and the difference in another signal. That allows mono FM receivers to receive and decode the sum signal while ignoring the difference signal, which is necessary only for separating the audio channels. Stereo FM receivers can receive a mono signal and decode it without the need for a second signal, and they can separate a sum signal to left and right channels if both sum and difference signals are received. Without the requirement for backward compatibility, a simpler method could have been chosen.

Full backward compatibility is particularly important in computer instruction set architectures, one of the most successful being the x86 family of microprocessors. Their full backward compatibility spans back to the 16-bit Intel 8086/8088 processors introduced in 1978. (The 8086/8088, in turn, were designed with easy machine-translatability of programs written for its predecessor in mind, although they were not instruction-set compatible with the 8-bit Intel 8080 processor as of 1974. The Zilog Z80, however, was fully backward compatible with the Intel 8080.)
Fully backward compatible processors can process the same binary executable software instructions as their predecessors, allowing the use of a newer processor without having to acquire new applications or operating systems. Similarly, the success of the Wi-Fi digital communication standard is attributed to its broad forward and backward compatibility; it became more popular than other standards that were not backward compatible.

In software 
Compiler backward compatibility may refer to the ability of a compiler of a newer version of the language to accept programs or data that worked under the previous version.

A data format is said to be backward compatible with its predecessor if every message or file that is valid under the old format is still valid, retaining its meaning, under the new format.

Tradeoffs

Benefits
There are several incentives for a company to implement backward compatibility. Backward compatibility can be used to preserve older software that would have otherwise been lost when a manufacturer decides to stop supporting older hardware. Classic video games are a common example used when discussing the value of supporting older software. The cultural impact of video games is a large part of their continued success, and some believe ignoring backward compatibility would cause these titles to disappear. Backward compatibility also acts as a selling point for new hardware, as an existing player base can more affordably upgrade to subsequent generations of a console. This also helps to make up for  lack of content at the launch of new systems, as users can pull from the previous console's library of games while developers transition to the new hardware. Moreover, studies in the mid-1990s found that even consumers who never play older games after purchasing a new system consider backward compatibility a highly desirable feature, valuing the mere ability to continue to play an existing collection of games even if they choose never to do so. Backward compatibility with the original PlayStation (PS) software discs and peripherals is considered to have been a key selling point for the PlayStation 2 (PS2) during its early months on the market.

Despite not being included at launch, Microsoft slowly incorporated backward compatibility for select titles on the Xbox One several years into its product life cycle. Players have racked up over a billion hours with backward compatible games on Xbox, and the newest generation of consoles such as PlayStation 5 and Xbox Series X/S also support this feature. A large part of the success and implementation of this feature is that the hardware within newer generation consoles is both powerful and similar enough to legacy systems that older titles can be broken down and re-configured to run on the Xbox One. This program has proven incredibly popular with Xbox players and goes against the recent trend of studio made remasters of classic titles, creating what some believe to be an important shift in console maker's strategies.

Costs
The monetary costs of supporting old software is considered a large drawback to the usage of backward compatibility. The associated costs of backward compatibility are a larger bill of materials if hardware is required to support the legacy systems; increased complexity of the product that may lead to longer time to market, technological hindrances, and slowing innovation; and increased expectations from users in terms of compatibility. Because of this, several console manufacturers phased out backward compatibility toward the end of the console generation in order to reduce cost and briefly reinvigorate sales before the arrival of newer hardware.

It is possible to bypass some of the hardware costs. In earlier versions of the PS2, a CPU core identical to that of the PS serves a dual purpose, either as the main CPU in PS mode, or upclocking itself to offload I/O in PS2 mode. Such an approach can backfire, however, as in the case of the Super Nintendo Entertainment System (Super NES), which opted for the peculiar 65C816 over more popular 16-bit microprocessors on the basis that it would allow easy compatibility with the original NES, but NES compatibility ultimately did not prove workable once the rest of the Super NES's architecture was designed.

Backward compatibility introduces the risk that developers will favor developing games that are compatible with both the old and new systems, since this gives them a larger base of potential buyers, resulting in a dearth of software which uses the advanced features of the new system.

With the decline in physical game sales and the rise of digital storefronts and downloads, some believe backward compatibility will soon be obsolete. Many game studios are re-mastering and re-releasing their most popular titles by improving the quality of graphics and adding new content. These remasters have found success by appealing both to nostalgic players who remember enjoying the original versions, and to newcomers who may not have had the original system it was released on. For most consumers, digital remasters are more appealing than hanging on to obsolete hardware. For the manufacturers of consoles, digital re-releases of classic titles are a large benefit. It not only removes the financial drawbacks of supporting older hardware, but also shifts all of the costs of updating software to the developers. The manufacturer gets a new addition to their system with name recognition, and the studio does not have to develop a new game.

See also

References

External links
 

 
Interoperability